Sabah State Library is a state department under the State Ministry of Education and Innovation Sabah which managing every of the public library branches in Sabah of Malaysia. The headquarters is located in Tasik Road, Off Maktab Gaya Road in Luyang of Kota Kinabalu.

History 
The first library of North Borneo was established as a section of the Broadcasting and Information Department in 1953. In 1966 through the newly formed federation of Malaysia, the library was merged with the Sabah Museum to form the Libraries and Museum Department before it was separated in 1972 with the formation of a Library Department under the Ministry of Social Welfare. The department administration was then passed to the State Ministry of Culture, Youth and Sports and the name began to be changed into Sabah State Library in 1976. Jurisdiction of the state library returned to the Ministry of Social Services in 1982.

Branches 
This is a list of Sabah State Library branches:

 Bandar Sri Indah Library
 Beaufort Library
 Beluran Library
 Keningau Library (regional)
 Kinabatangan Library
 Kota Belud Library
 Kota Marudu Library
 Kuala Penyu Library
 Kudat Library
 Kunak Library
 Lahad Datu Library
 Nabawan Library
 Papar Library
 Sandakan Library (regional)
 Semporna Library
 Sipitang Library
 Tambunan Library
 Tamparuli Library
 Tanjung Aru Library
 Tawau Library (regional)
 Tenom Library
 Tuaran Library
 UTC Library

References

External links 
 

Buildings and structures in Kota Kinabalu
Public libraries in Malaysia